Jozef Mores (born 21 September 1972) is a former football player from Slovakia and recently manager of ŽP Šport Podbrezová.

Managerial career
He started off his career as a coach of youths in FK Dukla Banská Bystrica at the age of 35.

References

External links
 Futbalnet profile
 

1972 births
Living people
Slovak footballers
Slovak football managers
Slovak expatriate footballers
FK Dukla Banská Bystrica players
FK Železiarne Podbrezová players
SSV Jahn Regensburg players
Expatriate footballers in Germany
Sportspeople from Ružomberok
Association football midfielders